Nanogomphodon is an extinct genus of cynodonts which existed in Germany during the Middle Triassic period.

Nanogomphodon were small herbivorous traversodontid gomphodonts. The type species is Nanogomphodon wildi. They are only known from a few isolated teeth recovered in 2006 from the Erfurt Formation of Baden-Württemberg, Germany.

References

Traversodontids
Prehistoric cynodont genera
Triassic synapsids of Europe
Middle Triassic synapsids
Fossils of Germany
Fossil taxa described in 2006